James Keogh (October 28, 1916 – May 10, 2006) was an American magazine editor and political advisor who worked as the executive editor of Time magazine and the head of the White House speechwriting staff under Richard Nixon.

Early life and education
Keogh was born in Platte County, Nebraska and graduated from Creighton University in Omaha in 1938.

Career 
He worked for the Omaha World-Herald in Omaha before working at Time magazine. He worked as an affairs reporter at Time in 1951, and was the assistant managing editor from 1961 to 1968.

Keogh worked as a special assistant to President Nixon in 1969, and became his head speechwriter in 1970. He was the director of the United States Information Agency from 1973 to 1977. Keogh also wrote two books, This Is Nixon in 1956, and President Nixon and the Press in 1972.

Death 
Keogh died on May 10, 2006, in Greenwich, Connecticut at the age of 89. The cause of death was respiratory failure.

References

External links
 THe Washington Post: James Keogh; Time Editor, Nixon Staffer
 The New York Times: James Keogh, 89, Time Editor And Wordsmith for Nixon

People from Platte County, Nebraska
Creighton University alumni
Writers from Nebraska
United States Information Agency directors
Time (magazine) people
1916 births
2006 deaths
American editors
White House Directors of Speechwriting